Automeris postalbida is a moth of the family Saturniidae first described by William Schaus in 1900. It is found from Costa Rica to Ecuador.

References

Moths described in 1900
Hemileucinae
Moths of Central America
Moths of South America